Entre violetas ("Among Violets") is a 1973 Mexican film. It was directed by Gustavo Alatriste.

External links 
 

1973 films
Mexican drama films
1970s Spanish-language films
Films directed by Gustavo Alatriste
1970s Mexican films